The imperial election of 1742 was an imperial election held to select the emperor of the Holy Roman Empire.  It took place in Frankfurt on January 24. The result was the election of Charles Albert of Bavaria, the first non-Habsburg emperor in hundreds of years.

Background

War of the Spanish Succession 

On October 3, 1700, weeks before his death, the childless and severely disabled Charles II of Spain named Philip V of Spain, his sister's grandson and the grandson of the French king Louis XIV of France, heir to the entire Spanish Empire.  The possession by the House of Bourbon of the French and Spanish thrones threatened the balance of power in Europe.  England, Austria and the Dutch Republic, fearing this threat, resurrected the Grand Alliance in support of the claim of Archduke Charles, then a young man of fifteen.  The Holy Roman Emperor Leopold I had married another sister of Charles II in 1666, and in 1685 their daughter surrendered her right to the Spanish throne to Archduke Charles, Leopold's son from a later marriage.  The first hostilities of the War of the Spanish Succession broke out in June 1701.  The Grand Alliance declared war on France in May 1702.

That same year, Maximilian II Emanuel, the elector of Bavaria, and his brother Joseph Clemens of Bavaria, the elector of Cologne, joined France in support of Philip's claim to the Spanish succession.  They were quickly forced into flight and were deprived of their electorates by the Imperial Diet in 1706.  They did not participate in the imperial election of 1711, which elected Archduke Charles as Charles VI.

The War of the Spanish Succession was ended by the treaties of Utrecht, Rastatt and Baden.  The last of these, signed on September 7, 1714, restored the territories and electorates of Maximilian Emanuel and Joseph Clemens. Charles VI renounced his claim to the Spanish throne to Philip.

The campaign of Charles VI 
In his later years, Charles VI tried to secure the election of his son-in-law, Francis Duke of Lorraine, as his successor.  He was opposed in these efforts by Charles Albert, elector of Bavaria.  Charles Albert believed that he had a better claim, as he was a son-in-law of Charles VI's older brother Joseph I, Holy Roman Emperor and a great-great-great grandson of Ferdinand II, Holy Roman Emperor.  Nevertheless, Francis tended to have greater support.

Charles VI died on October 20, 1740.  Maria Theresa, his daughter and Francis of Lorraine's wife, inherited his royal titles in  Austria, Hungary, Croatia, Bohemia, Transylvania, Mantua, Milan, Galicia and Lodomeria, the Austrian Netherlands and Parma, according to the terms of the Pragmatic Sanction of 1713.

War of the Austrian Succession 

Although Prussia had accepted the Pragmatic Sanction, it now repudiated Maria Theresa's inheritance as a violation of Salic law.  Its king Frederick the Great invaded Silesia on December 16.  France and Bavaria joined Prussia in 1741, and on November 26, they captured Prague.  On December 9, Charles Albert crowned himself King of Bohemia.

Election of 1742 
The electors called to Frankfurt the next month to elect the successor of Charles VI were:

 Philipp Karl von Eltz-Kempenich, elector of Mainz
 Franz Georg von Schönborn, elector of Trier
 Clemens August of Bavaria, elector of Cologne
 Charles Albert, elector of Bavaria and claimant to the Kingdom of Bohemia
 Augustus III of Poland, elector of Saxony
 Frederick the Great, elector of Brandenburg
 Charles III Philip, Elector Palatine, elector of the Electoral Palatinate
 George II of Great Britain, elector of Brunswick-Lüneburg

Clemens August was the brother of Charles Albert and Charles III Philip his cousin. Francis of Lorraine was supported by not only his wife, Maria Theresa, who claimed to be queen regnant of Bohemia, but also the electors of Mainz, Trier and Brunswick-Lüneburg.

Elected 
The electors of Brandenburg and Saxony remained uncommitted, but were wooed by the French to support Charles Albert.  Charles Albert won an additional advantage when he was able to secure the exclusion of Maria Theresa from the election, on the grounds that the succession to Bohemia remained unsettled.  With the three votes of the House of Wittelsbach and the support of the electorates of Saxony and Brandenburg, his election seemed inevitable.  The other three electors acquiesced.  Charles Albert was elected and crowned at Frankfurt on February 12 as Charles VII, the first non-Habsburg to be elected in some three hundred years.

Aftermath 
As a result of her exclusion, Maria Theresa did not accept the legitimacy of the election until after the death some three years later of Charles VII.

References 

1742
1742 in the Holy Roman Empire
18th-century elections in Europe
Non-partisan elections
Charles VII, Holy Roman Emperor